The Winston-Salem Chronicle is a weekly newspaper that targets the African-American community in Winston-Salem, North Carolina.

Ernie Pitt & Joseph N. C. Egemonye founded the Chronicle in 1974. Its office was on North Liberty Street. Derwin Montgomery and James Taylor, the managing directors of Chronicle Media Group LLC, said March 27, 2017 that their company is buying The Winston-Salem Chronicle Publishing Co. by May 2017. Taylor will become publisher at that time.
The Chronicle moved to a former Bank of America branch on East Fifth Street on October 1, 2017.

References

External links
Winston-Salem Chronicle website
Issues of the Winston-Salem Chronicle from 1974-2016

Weekly newspapers published in North Carolina
Mass media in Winston-Salem, North Carolina
African-American newspapers
Publications established in 1974